Beverly Hills, 90210 is a United States primetime teen drama which ran on the FOX network for ten years, from October 4, 1990 to May 17, 2000. The series lasted for 293 episodes and 11 specials. Note that the original pilot, which subsequently has aired, is not the original pilot of the show which did air.

Series overview

Episodes

Season 1 (1990–91)

Season 2 (1991–92)

Season 3 (1992–93)

Season 4 (1993–94)

Season 5 (1994–95)

Season 6 (1995–96)

Season 7 (1996–97)

Season 8 (1997–98)

Season 9 (1998–99)

Season 10 (1999–2000)

Specials

References

External links
 

Lists of American teen drama television series episodes